Clark James Gable (September 20, 1988 – February 22, 2019), also known as Clark Gable III, was an American actor, model, and television presenter. Gable was a host of the television reality show Cheaters.

Life and career
Gable was a grandson of actor Clark Gable, the son of John Clark Gable and Tracy Yarro, and the younger brother of actress Kayley Gable. His stepfather was former Chicago bassist Jason Scheff.

Gable was an actor and businessman. He owned a boutique men's fashion and surfing line of clothing and accessories. He was also the president of the online electronics store ClarkGableSpyGear.com.

Gable was arrested in 2011 for shining a laser pointer at a police helicopter in Los Angeles. He pled guilty and was sentenced to ten days in jail and three years of probation.

Gable hosted the reality show Cheaters from seasons 13 to 15.

Gable's daughter Shore LaRae Gable was born September 6, 2017.

Death 
Gable died at age 30 at Texas Health Presbyterian Hospital in Dallas on February 22, 2019, after being found unresponsive earlier that morning. He had overdosed on "illicit fentanyl, oxycodone, and alprazolam".

References

External links

 
 Clark James Gable Biography on Cheaters website
 Clark James Gable - Official Website

1988 births
2019 deaths
21st-century American male actors
American male film actors
American people of Pennsylvania Dutch descent
Drug-related deaths in Texas
Male actors from Malibu, California
Male models from California